The State Scientific and Technical Library of Ukraine, SSTL is the main academic library of Ukraine and is part of the system of scientific and technical information of the Ministry of Education and Science of Ukraine. The purpose of the State Scientific and Technical Library of Ukraine activity is to promote the implementation of state policy in the field of education, science and culture, and to ensure the access of scientists, specialists, and citizens to sources of scientific and technical information.

History 

In March 1935, the Interbranch Technical Library of the USSR was created that was the branch of the State Scientific Library (SSL) of the People's Commissariat of Heavy Industry (Narkomtjazhprom) of the USSR. In 1936, the Kyiv Branch of the National Library of Ukraine made 5 thousand copies of publications and served 20 thousand readers.

During World War II, almost all the fund and the library building itself were destroyed.

The restoration of the library began in late 1946. Until 1958, the name and subordination of the library changed several times. The renewed funds as of January 1, 1959, amounted to more than 200,000 units.

The library was granted the status of the State Republican Scientific and Technical Library on June 6, 1960, which was given the modern name in the time of independent Ukraine in 1992. Today the library belongs to the sphere of management of the Ministry of Education and Science of Ukraine.

Holdings 

The collection of the State Scientific and Technical Library of Ukraine contains more than 18 million items: patent documents, industrial and normative technical documents, dissertations, reports on R&D, deposited scientific works, books and periodicals of scientific and technical kind.

Scientific activities

The State Scientific and Technical Library of Ukraine conducts a number of scientific activities, the main ones are: conducting research in the field of library and information sciences meeting information needs of users, including employees of industrial, scientific and research institutions, representatives of the private sector; preservation, organization and maintenance of the diversified fund of scientific and technical literature; formation and use of scientific and technical information resources, including conducting scientific and information research on development and improvement of fund formation processes and the creation of a reference search engine; formation and development of the system of bibliographic indexes of the national scientific and technical bibliographic databases.

Also, the SSTL provides promotion of introduction and use of computer information and library technologies in the network of scientific and technical libraries; depositing the results of intellectual activity and creating relevant information products; information support of scientific research, including that of through organization of a centralized subscription to access scientific information and databases, providing advisory and practical assistance to users; conducting scientific and practical conferences, exhibitions, workshops, including international ones, ensuring the popularization of the results of scientific activity; scientific methodical and organizational work, organization of a permanent system of professional development of employees of the network of scientific and technical libraries of Ukraine.

Library projects

The State Scientific and Technical Library of Ukraine supports different projects:

Open Ukrainian Citation Index (OUCI) is a search engine and a citation database based on publication metadata from Crossref members. OUCI is intended to simplify the search of scientific publications, to attract the editors’ attention to the problem of completeness and quality of the metadata of Ukrainian scholarly publications, and will allow bibliometricians to freely study the relations between authors and documents from various disciplines, in particular in the field of social sciences and humanities. This project is aimed at supporting the Initiative for Open Citations.

References

External links 
 Official website
 Online Catalogue (OPAC)

Libraries in Kyiv
1935 establishments in Ukraine
Science libraries